The Knight Before Christmas is a 2019 Christmas fantasy rom-com film directed by Monika Mitchell and written by Cara J. Russell. It was released on November 21, 2019.

Filming took place in Orillia and Bracebridge in Ontario, Canada between April and May 2019, with Norwich castle scenes featuring Charleville Castle in Tullamore, Ireland.

Plot
In Norwich, England, on December 18, 1334, knight Sir Cole Christopher Fredrick Lyons (Josh Whitehouse) and his brother Geoffrey (Harry Jarvis) participate in an annual Christmas hawking competition. Cole goes to the woods, while Geoffrey combs the castle for the hawk. Cole soon runs into an old crone named Kayela (Ella Kenion), whom he offers to escort to a shelter. She thanks him for his kindness, and tells him that she will magically send him to a faraway land on a knightly quest, where he will see things like "flying steel dragons and horses" (airplanes and cars) and "magic boxes that make merry" (televisions). After her explanation, she gives him a glowing blue medallion and tells him that if he doesn't fulfill his quest before midnight on Christmas Eve, he will remain trapped in the present forever – but does not explain the nature of the quest itself.

In the year 2019 on the same day in Bracebridge, a small city in Ohio, high school science teacher Brooke Winters (Vanessa Hudgens), who is disillusioned by love, agrees to take her niece Claire to the opening of the "Christmas Castle", which is the same place Cole arrives in. Cole, confused by the new and unfamiliar surroundings, gets hit by Brooke's car by accident, and is taken to the hospital, where Officer Stevens (Arnold Pinnock) checks his background and assumes that he must have amnesia, as he has no ID and claims to be a medieval knight. Brooke offers to let him stay at her guest home while he recovers. Cole gradually acclimates to his new environment, discovering modern-day innovations such as radios, diners, manners, and Alexa.

Despite his manner of speech and strange habits, Cole quickly endears himself to Brooke's friends and family. They find him strange, but humor him, as does Brooke herself, who even agrees that it's possible he is who he claims to be. She opens up to him about her late parents and an ex-boyfriend who had left her for someone else years ago, and he slowly shares his own past with her as they grow more familiar. In his search for the quest given to him by the Kayela, Cole ends up rescuing two children who fall in a frozen lake and catches an escaping pickpocket, but does not feel fulfilled. On December 24, Cole helps Brooke host a successful Christmas feast. Later, he asks her to clarify the mistletoe tradition, and they kiss, which causes Cole's medallion to light up, meaning he has finally fulfilled his quest. Brooke walks him back to the Christmas Castle, where he had originally arrived, and they bid each other a heavy farewell. She returns home, heartbroken, while Cole is sent back to the 14th century.

On return, Cole discovers that he has arrived just in time for his brother's knighting ceremony; Geoffrey welcomes him back warmly, but soon recognizes his brother's unhappiness and urges him to return to Brooke. He sets off back into the woods to look for the old crone, declaring that he has finished his quest. Kayela reappears, and uses her magic to transport him back to 2019. On Christmas Day, Brooke is comforted by her sister, niece, and brother-in-law. They invite her to join them at the Christmas Castle, where Cole soon meets them, riding atop his horse Sherwyn. He declares his love to Brooke and his willingness to stay, which she happily accepts. The two mount Sherwyn and ride around the castle, admired by onlookers.

In a post-credits scene, Geoffrey meets the old crone, who greets him and asks for assistance the same way she did with Cole. She carries another medallion which glows as the scene comes to an end – indicating that Geoffrey will go through the same quest as his brother.

Cast

Release
The Knight Before Christmas was released on November 21, 2019.

Reception
The website's critics consensus reads: "While its plot borders on the absurd, The Knight Before Christmas is endearing and charming enough to make it a worthy addition to the holiday rom-com genre."

See also
 List of Christmas films

References

External links
 
 

2010s Christmas comedy films
2019 films
American Christmas comedy films
English-language Netflix original films
2019 romantic comedy films
Films about time travel
Films set in 2019
Films set in the 14th century
Films set in Ohio
Films set in Norfolk
American romantic comedy films
2010s English-language films
2010s American films